Street Warz is a compilation album by rappers Young Noble and JT the Bigga Figga, released October 22, 2002 on Outlaw Recordz and Get Low Recordz. The album was produced by the likes of Cozmo, DJ Premier, E.D.I., JT The Bigga Figga, Mike Dean, Quimmy Quim, Reefologist, Sean T and Track Addict.

Track listing

References

External links 
 OutlawzMedia.net Official Website

2002 compilation albums
Young Noble albums
JT the Bigga Figga albums
Albums produced by Cozmo
Albums produced by E.D.I.
Outlaw Recordz albums
Gangsta rap compilation albums